Bedlay railway station served the village of Chryston, North Lanarkshire, Scotland, in 1849 on the Monkland and Kirkintilloch Railway.

History 
The station was opened on 10 December 1849 by the Monkland Railways. It was known as Belday in the Glasgow Herald. Services only stopped here on Wednesdays and Saturdays. It was a very short-lived station, only being open for 3 weeks before closing on 31 December 1849.

References 

Disused railway stations in North Lanarkshire
Railway stations in Great Britain opened in 1849
Railway stations in Great Britain closed in 1849
1849 establishments in Scotland
1849 disestablishments in Scotland